Catephia nigrijuncta is a species of moth of the  family Erebidae. It is found in India.

References

Catephia
Moths described in 1914
Moths of Asia